In the Heat of the Night is the debut studio album by American singer Pat Benatar, released on August 27, 1979, by Chrysalis Records. The album debuted on the Billboard 200 for the week ending October 20, 1979, peaking at  12 in March 1980, almost six months after its release.

The album includes "Heartbreaker", her breakthrough single in the United States (where it reached the top 25), Canada and New Zealand (it reached the top 20 in both those countries). "Heartbreaker" was the third single released from the album, as neither the first single, Benatar's version of "I Need a Lover", or the second single, her rendition of "If You Think You Know How to Love Me", charted in the US, Canada, Australia or New Zealand.

In the Heat of the Night also contained "We Live for Love", which became Benatar's first top-10 entry in any country when it rose to No. 8 in Canada, while also reaching the top 30 in the US, New Zealand and Australia, her first sizable hit in the latter. In France, "We Live for Love" reached the top 40, although "Rated X" had previously reached the French top 30. In the Netherlands and Belgium, Benatar's rendition of "I Need a Lover" charted within the top 30.

On Billboard magazine's 1980 year-end top pop albums chart, In the Heat of the Night was listed at No. 7. The album also reached No. 3 in Canada, No. 8 in New Zealand, and No. 25 in Australia.

In the Heat of the Night was remastered and reissued on Capitol Records in 2006.

Track listing

Personnel
Credits adapted from the liner notes of In the Heat of the Night.

Musicians
 Pat Benatar – vocals
 Neil Giraldo – lead guitar, keyboards, slide guitar, back-up vocals
 Scott St. Clair Sheets – guitars
 Roger Capps – bass, back-up vocals
 Glen Alexander Hamilton – drums

Technical
 Mike Chapman – production 
 Peter Coleman – production 
 Steve Hall – mastering

Artwork
 Ria Lewerke – art direction, design
 Alex Chatelain – photography

Charts

Weekly charts

Year-end charts

Certifications

References

1979 debut albums
Albums produced by Mike Chapman
Chrysalis Records albums
Pat Benatar albums